Difenamizole (INN; brand name Pasalin; former developmental code name AP-14) is a nonsteroidal anti-inflammatory drug (NSAID) and analgesic of the pyrazolone group related to metamizole. It has monoaminergic properties, including inhibition of monoamine oxidase, augmentation of pargyline-induced elevation of striatal dopamine levels, inhibition of K+-induced striatal dopamine release, and inhibition of the reuptake of dopamine.

See also
 Famprofazone
 Morazone

References

Analgesics
Dopamine reuptake inhibitors
Monoamine oxidase inhibitors
Nonsteroidal anti-inflammatory drugs
Pyrazoles
Pyrazolones